Franck Alain James Leboeuf (born 22 January 1968), typically anglicised as Frank Leboeuf, is a French actor, sports commentator and former international footballer who played as a centre-back. With the France national team, Leboeuf won the 1998 FIFA World Cup and 2000 European Championship as well as a number of domestic trophies, most famously during his five years at Chelsea. Since the conclusion of his playing career, Leboeuf has transitioned to acting, appearing in stage and film productions.

Club career
Leboeuf was born in Marseille and raised in Saint-Cyr-sur-Mer. He was introduced to football by his father, a former Stade Rennais coach, who trained children in the sport. After starting his career in 1986 in the lower divisions of the French leagues, Leboeuf moved to Laval in 1988. In 1991, he moved to Strasbourg and played there until 1996, when he made a switch to English club Chelsea for £2.5m.

He played over 200 games for the club and scored 24 goals, mainly from penalties and set pieces. With Chelsea, he won two FA Cups, one League Cup and one Cup Winners' Cup. He left in 2001 for  club Olympique Marseille, before finishing out his career in Qatar.

International career
For France, Leboeuf was capped 50 times, scoring four goals. His first two came on 6 September 1995 in a UEFA Euro 1996 qualifier at home to Azerbaijan, contributing to a 10–0 win that remains France's record. Although he was mainly a substitute in the 1998 World Cup, he stepped in for red carded Laurent Blanc to play in the final, a 3–0 win against Brazil, a match in which he man-marked the highly rated striker Ronaldo.

In a UEFA Euro 2000 qualifier on 9 June 1999, Leboeuf scored the only goal from the penalty spot with five minutes to go as world champions France struggled away to amateurs Andorra. He received a winner's medal at the finals in Belgium and the Netherlands, though Blanc and Marcel Desailly were the preferred defensive partnership, including in the final.

He scored a late winner against co-hosts South Korea on 26 May ahead of the 2002 FIFA World Cup (3–2). Holders France were eliminated in the group stage in a shock, and he retired from the team.

International goals
Scores and results list France's goal tally first, score column indicates score after each Leboeuf goal.

Style of play
A cultured centre-back, Leboeuf was noted for his long range passing ability and also for his consistent penalty-taking throughout his career. He took more than 20 penalties for Chelsea, missing just 3 times.

Acting

In 2001, whilst still playing football for Chelsea, Leboeuf had made his first acting appearance in the film Taking Sides.

Following his retirement from competitive football, Leboeuf spent two years living in Los Angeles. During this time he played for amateur team Hollywood United, alongside celebrity team-mates such as Vinnie Jones, Steve Jones and Anthony LaPaglia. Leboeuf studied at the Lee Strasberg Institute in West Hollywood, keeping a low profile, and won his first acting work as a TV commentator, for a pay cheque totalling $100, which he keeps as a memento.

Leboeuf acted in several theatre plays in France, including starring alongside Jean-Francois Garreaud in L'intrus in 2010 and a role in the play Avec Ma Belle Mère et Moi. In 2014, Leboeuf played a French Resistance fighter in the World War II film Allies and a doctor in the Stephen Hawking biopic The Theory of Everything.

Other media
Leboeuf works as a sports commentator and analyst for RMC and ESPN in the United States. In 2010, he was a contestant on the reality television show Koh-Lanta in the Koh-Lanta, le choc des héros special series. He was forced to depart the show after two episodes due to a back injury he had suffered in a car accident shortly before the series commenced. In 2014, Leboeuf made an appearance in the television comedy series Nos Chers Voisins and began writing a column for Téléfoot.

In 2019, Leboeuf competed on the first season of Mask Singer, the French version of the global franchise Masked Singer, disguised as a peacock.

Personal life
Leboeuf is married to actress Chrislaure Nollet and has two children, Jade and Hugo, from his first marriage to Beatrice. His amateur sporting hobbies include tennis, swimming and boxing.

Franck Leboeuf is the cousin of the hotelier Philippe Leboeuf.

Following the 1998 World Cup, he was appointed a Knight of the Legion of Honour in 1998.

Honours
Strasbourg
Division 2 play-offs: 1991–92
Coupe de France runner-up: 1994–95
UEFA Intertoto Cup: 1995

Chelsea
FA Cup: 1996–97, 1999–2000
Football League Cup: 1997–98
FA Charity Shield: 2000
UEFA Cup Winners' Cup: 1997–98
UEFA Super Cup: 1998

Al-Sadd
Qatar Stars League: 2003–04

Al-Wakrah
Sheikh Jassim Cup: 2004–05

France
FIFA World Cup: 1998
UEFA European Championship: 2000
FIFA Confederations Cup: 2001

Orders
Knight of the Legion of Honour: 1998

References

External links

 
 

1968 births
Living people
1998 FIFA World Cup players
2001 FIFA Confederations Cup players
2002 FIFA World Cup players
21st-century French male actors
Al Sadd SC players
Al-Wakrah SC players
Association football defenders
Chelsea F.C. players
Chevaliers of the Légion d'honneur
Expatriate footballers in England
Expatriate footballers in Qatar
Expatriate soccer players in the United States
FA Cup Final players
FIFA Confederations Cup-winning players
FIFA World Cup-winning players
Footballers from Marseille
French expatriate footballers
French expatriate male actors in the United States
French expatriate sportspeople in England
French expatriate sportspeople in Qatar
French expatriate sportspeople in the United States
French footballers
France international footballers
French male film actors
French male television actors
Hollywood United players
Ligue 1 players
Male actors from Marseille
Olympique de Marseille players
Premier League players
Qatar Stars League players
RC Strasbourg Alsace players
Stade Lavallois players
UEFA Euro 1996 players
UEFA Euro 2000 players
UEFA European Championship-winning players